Sympycninae is a subfamily of flies in the family Dolichopodidae. In some classifications, this subfamily includes the genera of the subfamilies Peloropeodinae and Xanthochlorinae.

Genera 
Brevimyia Miller, 1945
Calyxochaetus Bigot, 1888
Campsicnemus Haliday in Walker, 1851
Ceratopos Vaillant, 1952
Chaetogonopteron De Meijere, 1913
Colobocerus Parent, 1933
Erebomyia Runyon & Hurley, 2004
Filatopus Robinson, 1970
Hercostomoides Meuffels & Grootaert, 1997
Humongochela Evenhuis, 2004
Hyptiocheta Becker, 1922
Ischiochaetus Bickel & Dyte, 1989
Lamprochromus Mik, 1878
Liparomyia White, 1916
Micropygus Bickel & Dyte, 1989
Negrobovus Wang, Evenhuis, Ji, Yang & Zhang, 2021
Neoparentia Robinson, 1967
Nothorhaphium Bickel, 1999
Nurteria Dyte & Smith, 1980
Olegonegrobovia Grichanov, 1995 (possible synonym of Teuchophorus?)
Parasyntormon Wheeler, 1899
Phrudoneura Meuffels & Grootaert, 1987 (incertae sedis)
Pinacocerus Van Duzee, 1930
Scelloides Bickel & Dyte, 1989
Scotiomyia Meuffels & Grootaert, 1997
Suschania Negrobov, 2003
Sympycnus Loew, 1857
Syntormon Loew, 1857
Telmaturgus Mik, 1874
Tetrachaetus Bickel & Dyte, 1989
Teuchophorus Loew, 1857
Yumbera Bickel, 1992

References 

 

 
Dolichopodidae subfamilies